Edward Peter Withers (8 September 1915 – 7 June 1994) was an English footballer who played as a forward for Southampton and Bristol Rovers in the 1930s. At Bristol Rovers, he acquired the nickname "Tosh".

Football career
Withers was born in Ower, on the edge of the New Forest, and played youth football in the New Forest League. He was educated at Clarke's College in The Avenue, Southampton.

He joined the ground staff at Southampton Football Club as an amateur in August 1933. He soon "showed an eye for goal" and was given a professional contract in October 1934, becoming an established member of the reserves, playing in the Football Combination. He made his first-team debut when he took the place of the injured Dick Neal for the Second Division match at Swansea Town on 19 September 1936. Withers played at outside-right in this match, which ended in a 5–1 defeat. Withers made five more appearances that season as cover for injured players in various positions across the forward line, without scoring.

In December 1937, he moved to Bristol Rovers of the Third Division South, where he became a more settled member of the first team, making 17 league appearances, generally at inside-right, scoring four goals. In the summer of 1938, however, his professional career was over and he returned to Southampton, where he continued to play local non-league football with Bramtoco Sports.

Later career
Within a year, he left Southampton to move to London where he worked as a sports masseur. After the Second World War, he returned to Hampshire and became an accountant.

References

1915 births
People from New Forest District
1994 deaths
English footballers
English Football League players
Association football forwards
Southampton F.C. players
Bristol Rovers F.C. players